Wellington South was a Canadian federal electoral district represented in the House of Commons of Canada from 1867 to 1968. It was located in the province of Ontario. It was created by the British North America Act of 1867 as the "South Riding of the county of Wellington". The County of Wellington was divided into three ridings: the North, South and Centre Ridings".

The South Riding initially consisted of the Town of Guelph, and the Townships of Guelph and Puslinch. In 1872, the Townships of Eramosa and Erin were added to the riding.

In 1903, the county of Wellington was divided into two ridings, to be called the north and the south ridings of Wellington. To the south riding were added consisted of the townships of  Nichol and Pilkington, and the villages of Elora, Erin and Fergus.

In 1924, the riding was renamed "Wellington South" and was defined as consisting of the part of the county of Wellington lying south of the north boundary of the township of Pilkington, the north and east boundaries of the township of Nichol and the north boundary of the townships of Eramosa and Erin.

In 1933, it was redefined to consist of the part of the county of Wellington lying south of the north boundary of the township of Pilkington, the north and east boundaries of the township of Nichol and the north and east boundaries of the townships of Eramosa.

In 1947, it was redefined to consist of the city of Guelph and the townships of Puslinch, Eramosa, Guelph, Pilkington and Nichol. In 1952, the township of Erin and the village of Elora were added, while the township of Nichol was removed.

The electoral district was abolished in 1966 when it was redistributed between Halton, Wellington and Wellington—Grey ridings.

Members of Parliament

This riding elected the following members of the House of Commons of Canada:

Election results

|-

|Liberal
| David Stirton
|align="right"| acclaimed
|}

|-

|Liberal
|Donald Guthrie
|align="right"| 1,366
|align="right"|51.5
|align="right"|-26.6
 
|Conservative
|James Goldie
|align="right"|1,288
|align="right"|48.5
|align="right"|26.6
|-
|colspan="3" align="right"|Total valid votes
|colspan="1" align="right"|2,654
|colspan="1" align="right"|100.0
|}

|- 
 
|Conservative
|Hugh Guthrie
|align="right"| acclaimed
|}

See also 

 List of Canadian federal electoral districts
 Past Canadian electoral districts

External links 

 History of past election results from Parliament of Canada

Former federal electoral districts of Ontario